Sorin Matei (born 6 July 1963) is a retired Romanian high jumper. His personal best jump is 2.40 metres, achieved in June 1990 in Bratislava. As of August 2018, Matei is tied for 7th place on the, men's high jump outdoor, all time top list, behind Javier Sotomayor, Mutaz Essa Barshim, Patrik Sjöberg, Bohdan Bondarenko, Igor Paklin and Ivan Ukhov. Matei competed at the 1980, 1988 and 1992 Olympics and placed 13th in 1980 and 1992.

International competitions

References

1963 births
Living people
Sportspeople from Bucharest
Romanian male high jumpers
Olympic male high jumpers
Olympic athletes of Romania
Athletes (track and field) at the 1980 Summer Olympics
Athletes (track and field) at the 1988 Summer Olympics
Athletes (track and field) at the 1992 Summer Olympics
Universiade medalists in athletics (track and field)
Universiade bronze medalists for Romania
Medalists at the 1987 Summer Universiade
Goodwill Games medalists in athletics
Competitors at the 1986 Goodwill Games
World Athletics Championships athletes for Romania
Japan Championships in Athletics winners
Presidents of the Romanian Athletics Federation